The Hazlet Township Public Schools is a comprehensive community public school district that serves students in pre-kindergarten through twelfth grade from Hazlet, in Monmouth County, New Jersey, United States.

As of the 2018–19 school year, the district, comprising eight schools, had an enrollment of 2,871 students and 254.1 classroom teachers (on an FTE basis), for a student–teacher ratio of 11.3:1.

The district is classified by the New Jersey Department of Education as being in District Factor Group "DE", the fifth-highest of eight groupings. District Factor Groups organize districts statewide to allow comparison by common socioeconomic characteristics of the local districts. From lowest socioeconomic status to highest, the categories are A, B, CD, DE, FG, GH, I and J.

Schools
Schools in the district (with 2018–19 enrollment data from the National Center for Education Statistics) are:
Early childhood
Sycamore Drive Early Childhood Learning Center (295 students; in PreK-K)
Elementary schools
Lilian Drive Elementary School (252; 1-4)
Middle Road Elementary School (277; 1-4)
Raritan Valley Elementary School (243; 1-4)
Beers Street Elementary School (225; 5-6)
Cove Road Elementary School (178; 5-6)
Middle schools
Hazlet Middle School (451; 7-8) 
High school
Raritan High School (922; 9-12)

Administration
Core members of the district's administration are:
Dr. Scott Ridley, Superintendent
Christopher Mullins, Business Administrator / Board Secretary

Board of education
The district's board of education, with nine members, sets policy and oversees the fiscal and educational operation of the district through its administration. As a Type II school district, the board's trustees are elected directly by voters to serve three-year terms of office on a staggered basis, with three seats up for election each year held (since 2012) as part of the November general election.

References

External links
Hazlet Township Public Schools
 
School Data for the Hazlet Township Public Schools, National Center for Education Statistics

Hazlet, New Jersey
New Jersey District Factor Group DE
School districts in Monmouth County, New Jersey